Ronald W. Ryckman Sr. (born December 16, 1948) is an American politician. He was a Republican member of the Kansas House of Representatives representing the 115th District which includes a southern section of Dodge City, Ashland, Fowler, Meade, Plains, Copeland, Montezuma, Ensign, Ingalls and Cimarron in southwestern Kansas from 2011 to 2017.  Ryckman's first term began in January 2011 when he was elected by precinct people to replace Garrett Love who was elected to the State Senate after defeating former Speaker Melvin Neufeld. Ryckman served in the United States Army from 1970-72 before beginning his twenty-nine-year career as a public school teacher. He served on the Meade School Board from 2009 until elected to the Kansas House.

On March 4, 2021, Ryckman was appointed to the Senate after the death of Bud Estes.

Honors and awards
 Distinguished Service Award, Meade Nazarene Church (2004)
 Nominated for Kansas Teacher of the Year (2003)
 500 Career Wins Certificate of Achievement from KSHSAA (2001)
 Selected Coach of the Year, Southwest Daily Times or Dodge City Globe five times
 Kansas Key Club Adviser of the Year (1990)
 Coach of the Decade, Southwest Daily Times (1990)
 National High School Gold Award (1989)
 Close-Up Kansas Award (1987)
 Coached eleven Meade Volleyball teams that went to State

Committee Memberships
 Judiciary
 Education
 General Government Budget

References

External links 
 Kansas Legislature
 Kansas Legislature Standing Committees
 Ronald Ryckman, Kansas Legislature Member Profiles

Living people
1948 births
Republican Party members of the Kansas House of Representatives
School board members in Kansas
21st-century American politicians
People from Meade County, Kansas
Republican Party Kansas state senators